Network Rail Certification Body Limited (commonly known as Network Certification Body or NCB) is a private limited company providing conformity assessment and consulting services to the rail industry. The company is headquartered in Milton Keynes, United Kingdom and was founded in 2012 as a subsidiary of Network Rail.

History 

Established in April 2012, NCB was formed to provide conformity assessment services to the rail industry. NCB is a subsidiary of Network Rail Infrastructure Ltd, but remains independent of its parent organization. NCB offers its services to any organization carrying out works on railway infrastructure and vehicles that need to comply with UK rail safety legislation. 
Although established in 2012 as a separate legal entity, NCB has extensive long-standing experience of working alongside rail industry projects from wagon alterations through small infrastructure upgrades to new pieces of rail infrastructure such as HS1. Three Network Rail teams were transferred to the new company:
 an existing UKAS accredited Notified Body and Rail Safety and Standards Board accredited vehicle acceptance body, 
 an infrastructure conformance team delivering independent competent person safety verification under the Railways and Other Guided Transport Systems (Safety) Regulations 2006 (ROGS), and
 a private wagons registration agreement team providing support to owners and operators of private wagons for use on the railway.

Corporate leadership 

James Collinson was appointed Director, NCB in April 2012 having been involved in establishing the new company. In December 2013 he became managing director on the appointment of Mark Thickbroom to the new role of Finance and Commercial Director for NCB.

Board of directors 

As of June 2021, the current NCB board members are:

Neil Hannah, Chairman
Sam Brunker, Managing Director
Mark Thickbroom, Finance and Commercial Director
Sally Rose, Shareholders Representative
George Bearfield, Non-executive Director

Notable projects 

Thameslink Programme – NCB provides safety verification and Assessment Body services for the project.

North West Electrification Project. As part of the Northern Hub project Phase 1 of the North West Electrification was for the Manchester to West Coast Main Line and Newton-le-Willows electrification project to be completed in December 2013. NCB was selected as the Notified Body (NoBo), Designated Body (DeBo) and to provide safety verification.

References

External links 

 NCB

Rail infrastructure in the United Kingdom
Railway companies of the United Kingdom
British companies established in 2012
Companies based in Milton Keynes